The 2014–15 Villanova Wildcats men's basketball team represented Villanova University in the 2014–15 NCAA Division I men's basketball season. Led by head coach Jay Wright in his 14th season, the Wildcats participated as members of the Big East Conference and played their home games at The Pavilion , with some select home games at the Wells Fargo Center in Philadelphia, Pennsylvania. They finished the season 33–3, 16–2 in Big East play to win the Big East regular season championship. They defeated Marquette, Providence, and Xavier to win the Big East tournament. As a result, they received the conference's automatic bid to the NCAA tournament as the No. 1 seed in the East Region. They defeated Lafayette in the Second Round before being upset in the Third Round by NC State. The Wildcats set a single-season school record for wins with 33.

Previous season 
The 2013–14 Villanova Wildcats finished the season with an overall record of 29–5, with a record of 16–2 in the Big East regular season to capture their Big East regular season title. In the 2014 Big East tournament, the Wildcats were upset by Seton Hall, 64–63 in the quarterfinals. They were invited to the 2014 NCAA Division I men's basketball tournament which they defeated Milwaukee in the second round before getting eliminated by eventual NCAA Tournament Champion Connecticut in the third round.

Offseason

Departures

Incoming recruits

Roster

Schedule and results

|-
!colspan=9 style="background:#013974; color:#67CAF1;"| Exhibition

|-
!colspan=9 style="background:#013974; color:#67CAF1;"| Non-conference regular season

|-
!colspan=9 style="background:#013974; color:#67CAF1;"| Big East Conference Play

|-
!colspan=9 style="background:#013974; color:#67CAF1;"| Big East tournament

|-
!colspan=9 style="background:#013974; color:#67CAF1;"| NCAA tournament

Rankings

*AP does not release post-NCAA tournament rankings

References

Villanova Wildcats
Villanova Wildcats men's basketball seasons
Villanova
Villanova Wildcats men's basketball team
Villanova Wildcats men's basketball team